Richard W. "Dick" Johnson (April 28, 1923 – June 21, 2005) was a sailor from United States Virgin Islands, who represented his country at the 1976 Summer Olympics in Kingston, Ontario, Canada as helmsman in the Soling. With crew members Tim Kelbert and Doug Graham they took the 24th place.

Sources

External links
 
 
 

1923 births
2005 deaths
United States Virgin Islands male sailors (sport)
Olympic sailors of the United States Virgin Islands
Sailors at the 1976 Summer Olympics – Soling
Sportspeople from Chicago